The 1991 Austrian Tennis Grand Prix was a women's tennis tournament played on indoor carpet courts at the Intersport Arena in Linz, Austria that was part of Tier V of the 1991 WTA Tour. It was the fifth edition of the tournament and was held from 11 February through 17 February 1991. First-seeded Manuela Maleeva-Fragnière won the singles title and earned $18,000 first-prize money as well as 110 ranking points.

Finals

Singles
 Manuela Maleeva-Fragnière defeated  Petra Langrová 7–5, 6–3
 It was Maleeva-Fragnière's 1st singles title of the year and the 13th of her career.

Doubles
 Manuela Maleeva-Fragnière /  Raffaella Reggi defeated  Petra Langrová /  Radka Zrubáková 6–4, 1–6, 6-3
 It was Maleeva-Fragnière's 1st doubles title of the year and the 3rd of her career. It was Reggi's 1st doubles title of the year and the 3rd of her career.

References

External links
 WTA tournament edition details
 ITF tournament edition details

EA-Generali Ladies Linz
Linz Open
EA-Generali Ladies Linz
EA-Generali Ladies Linz
Generali